Curiosity Killed the Cat was a British pop band that achieved success in the UK in the late 1980s, with hit singles such as "Down to Earth", "Misfit" and "Ordinary Day", from their No. 1 debut album, Keep Your Distance. This was followed by Getahead with the accompanying hit "Name and Number", that was recreated by De La Soul in "Ring Ring Ring (Ha Ha Hey)" in 1991, Jaheim in "Ain't Leavin Without You" in 2010, and Little Mix in "How Ya Doin'?" in 2012. In the early 1990s, the band's bassist left, and billed as 'Curiosity' they collaborated with Simon Cowell recording "Hang On in There Baby" on the album Back to Front.

Career
The band played soulful, jazzy and funky pop music, and was initially signed to Mercury Records. They first came to notice of the UK music press when they worked with Andy Warhol for the video of their 1986 single "Misfit". This featured the band in New York City and at one point featured frontman Ben Volpeliere-Pierrot dancing down a side street whilst Andy Warhol referenced Bob Dylan's 1965 long-form promotional film for "Subterranean Homesick Blues" by dropping pieces of white card in time to the music.

The single was initially unsuccessful but the release of their next single, "Down to Earth", gave the band a Top 3 hit in early 1987. The band's first album, Keep Your Distance, entered the UK Albums Chart at No. 1 in April 1987, and stayed in the Top Ten for 13 weeks. Further singles included "Ordinary Day" (UK No. 11), "Free" (UK No. 56) and a re-release of "Misfit" (UK No. 7). "Misfit" was also their only U.S. charting single, peaking at No. 42.

The band's second album, Getahead, was released in 1989, led by the single "Name and Number" (UK No. 14), and its "hey how you doin'" refrain found itself in the Top 10 two years later as part of the De La Soul song "Ring Ring Ring (Ha Ha Hey)". The album, however, was not as successful in comparison to their first album, peaking at No. 29.

After the lacklustre performance of Getahead and its second single "First Place", the band shortened their name to 'Curiosity' but were dropped by Mercury Records. Bass player Nick Thorpe then left the band. However, in 1992, the band (now a three-piece and signed to RCA Records) returned to the UK Top 3 with a cover of Johnny Bristol's "Hang On in There Baby". Despite this, the band's follow up singles (covers of "I Need Your Lovin'" and "Gimme the Sunshine") were unsuccessful, which resulted in the album Back to Front only being released in Japan and selected overseas markets. The band then split up.

In 2001, the band reformed for an appearance on a National Lottery midweek show on BBC 1, and since then Volpeliere has toured under the name Curiosity Killed the Cat, on a number of 1980s revival packages.

In November 2015, a compilation album, called 80's Recovered featured many groups. Curiosity Killed the Cat did a cover of The Doobie Brothers track "Long Train Runnin'", with a regular version, and a remix.

Band members
 Ben Volpeliere-Pierrot – vocals (born Martin Benedict Volpeliere-Pierrot, 19 May 1965, Earls Court, London)
 Julian Godfrey Brookhouse – guitar (born 15 May 1963, Putney, Surrey)
 Nick Thorpe – bass guitar, keyboards (born Nicholas Bernard Thorp, 25 October 1964, Sunbury-on-Thames, Middlesex)
 Migi Drummond – drums (born Miguel John Drummond, 27 January 1964, Strawberry Hill, Middlesex)

Lead singer Ben Volpeliere-Pierrot was best known for wearing a beret in most pictures of the band. He later revealed it was in fact a peaked fisherman's hat, turned round with the peak to the rear so that it resembled a beret. Ben VP (as he was billed on a number of solo singles in the mid-1990s) was frequently referred to as 'Ben Vol-au-vent Parrot' in Smash Hits magazine, with 'Bendy Ben' (or 'Boozy Ben') also used. He also appeared as a model on the front of Mike Read's Pop Quiz board game.

In 1995, Migi Drummond and Nick Thorp set up Naked Records which was acquired a year later by software maker Eidos Plc.

Toby Anderson co-wrote all tracks and played keyboards on the album Keep Your Distance. Session guitarist/keyboard player Mike McEvoy (Michael J McEvoy) co-wrote the songs on their Getahead album and Toto drummer Jeff Porcaro played on three tracks ("Cascade", "Can't Grow Trees on Money" and "Who Are You").

Discography

Albums

Studio albums

Compilation albums

Video albums

Singles

References

External links
 on VH1

English pop music groups
Musical groups from London
Sophisti-pop musical groups
Musical groups established in 1984
Mercury Records artists
RCA Records artists